The Hankyū Minoh Line (阪急箕面線 Mino-o sen) is a Japanese railway line operated by Hankyu Railway which connects Ishibashi Station in Ikeda and Minoh. Its main function is to provide access to Osaka, but this requires a transfer except during commute hours.

History
The Minoo Arima Electric Railway Co. opened the entire line in 1910 as 1435mm gauge dual track, electrified at 600 VDC.

In 1969 the voltage was raised to 1500 VDC.

List of stations on the Minoh Line
Some commute trains continue through the Takarazuka Line to Umeda.

References
This article incorporates material from the corresponding article in the Japanese Wikipedia

Minoo Line
Minoo Line
Rail transport in Osaka Prefecture
Osaka University transportation